Le Gall is a Breton surname (Ar Gall), and may refer to:

 Amélie Le Gall, French cyclist in the 1890s
 Anthony Le Gall (born 1985), French footballer
 Frank Le Gall (born 1959), French author of comics
 Jean-François Le Gall (born 1959), French mathematician
 Jean-Yves Le Gall (born 1959), French engineer and businessman

See also
 Gall (surname)

Surnames of Breton origin
Breton-language surnames